Merit Kerstin Hertzman-Ericson, née Lundberg (4 February 1911 in Danderyd – 26 March 1998 in Saltsjöbaden) was a Swedish psychologist and author.

Merit Hertzman-Ericson was the daughter of construction engineer Ernst Lundberg and Astrid Svensson. She was the sister of actor Marianne Nielsen and aunt to actor Monica Nielsen. She was also a grandmother of actress Pernilla August and artist Anna Hertzman-Ericson.

After graduating in Stockholm in 1930, she continued at the Sorbonne University in Paris, after which she returned to Sweden, obtaining a B.A. in Stockholm in 1942 and PhL in 1946. She was a director at the New School School of 1942-1943, Clinical Psychologist at Stockholm Central for Psychic Children- and youth care from 1950, psychologist at the Stockholm City Children's Care Board, film censor for the Norwegian Film Agency. She was a secretary of the Swedish Association for Group Psychotherapy, Board member of the Clinical Section at the Psychology Association.

She married in 1932 the engineer Bo Hertzman-Ericson (1903-1977). They had six children, the twins Li and Lo 1933, Tom in 1936, Kaj in 1940 and the second twins Vynn and Jann in 1945.

Publications
The Child's Mental Development (1952)
My Child is not Like Others (1954)
Children are Children and What Children are Schoolers? (1956)
Group Activities with Mothers in Mental Childcare and Youth Care (1958)

References

1911 births
1998 deaths
People from Danderyd Municipality
Swedish psychologists
20th-century Swedish women writers
Swedish women psychologists
20th-century psychologists